"Do It for Love" is a song written by Jesse Barish and performed by Marty Balin. It reached #17 on the U.S. adult contemporary chart and #107 on the U.S. pop chart in 1983. The song was featured on his 1983 album, Lucky.

The song was produced by Val Garay.

References

1983 songs
1983 singles
Songs written by Jesse Barish
Marty Balin songs
EMI America Records singles
Song recordings produced by Val Garay